Bilenke is a village in Skadovsk Raion, Kherson Oblast (province) of Ukraine.

Demographics
Native language as of the Ukrainian Census of 2001:
 Ukrainian 93.48%
 Russian 6.52%

References

Villages in Skadovsk Raion